Christa Théret (born 25 June 1991) is a French actress, best known for her role of Andrée Heuschling in Renoir.

Early life
As a child, Théret aspired to be a teacher and then to become an actress.

Career
Théret's acting career began at the age 11, when she did her first film, Headhunter, in 2005. Then, aged 14, she played a role in Le Couperet as Betty Davert. Then, in 2007, she starred in Et toi t'es sur qui? as a gothic teenager named Julie dite Batman. In 2008, she had her first big break in with the lead role in Lisa Azuelos' blockbuster LOL, which led her to be nominated for the César for Best Promising Actress. In 2012, she also starred in L'homme qui rit as Déa. In the future, she wants to be a director. She is also writing her first short movie. Théret featured in Foals' 2019 music video for the track "Exits".

Filmography

References

External links

 
 
 

1991 births
Living people
French film actresses
Actresses from Paris
21st-century French actresses
French television actresses